KRT73 is a keratin gene. It is responsible for hair formation, along with other genes, and it encodes a protein present in the inner root sheath of hair follicles.

References